Christopher John Foley (born 25 February 1956) is an Australian politician. Born in Brisbane, he became a certified financial planner and received a Diploma in Christian Doctrine and Practice, was an Associate in Theology, and became a Justice of the Peace. An ordained minister with the Wesleyan Methodist Church of Australia, he is married with five children.

He is now retired now from politics and as a pastor of Grace community church.
He was elected as an independent to the Legislative Assembly of Queensland in a 2003 by-election for the seat of Maryborough following the resignation due to ill health of another independent, former One Nation MLA John Kingston. Foley was re-elected at the 2004, 2006 and 2009 elections. He lost his seat at the 2012 election to the Liberal National Party of Queensland.

References

Independent members of the Parliament of Queensland
1956 births
Living people
Members of the Queensland Legislative Assembly
21st-century Australian politicians